Charles Edmund Kay (2 March 1884 – 27 September 1964) was an Australian rules footballer who played with St Kilda in the Victorian Football League (VFL).

Notes

External links 

1884 births
1964 deaths
Australian rules footballers from Victoria (Australia)
St Kilda Football Club players